The electric potential (also called the electric field potential, potential drop, the electrostatic potential) is defined as the amount of work energy needed to move a unit of electric charge from a reference point to the specific point in an electric field. More precisely, it is the energy per unit charge for a test charge that is so small that the disturbance of the field under consideration is negligible. Furthermore, the motion across the field is supposed to proceed with negligible acceleration, so as to avoid the test charge acquiring kinetic energy or producing radiation. By definition, the electric potential at the reference point is zero units. Typically, the reference point is earth or a point at infinity, although any point can be used. 

By dividing out the charge on the particle a quotient is obtained that is a property of the electric field itself. In short, an electric potential is the electric potential energy per unit charge.

This value can be calculated in either a static (time-invariant) or a dynamic (time-varying) electric field at a specific time with the unit joules per coulomb (J⋅C−1) or volt (V). The electric potential at infinity is assumed to be zero.

In electrodynamics, when time-varying fields are present, the electric field cannot be expressed only in terms of a scalar potential. Instead, the electric field can be expressed in terms of both the scalar electric potential and the magnetic vector potential. The electric potential and the magnetic vector potential together form a four-vector, so that the two kinds of potential are mixed under Lorentz transformations.

Practically, the electric potential is a continuous function in all space, because a spatial derivative of a discontinuous electric potential yields an electric field of impossibly infinite magnitude. Though electric field is not continuous across an idealized surface charge, it is not infinite at any point. Therefore, the electric potential is continuous across an idealized surface charge.

Introduction 
Classical mechanics explores concepts such as force, energy, and potential. Force and potential energy are directly related. A net force acting on any object will cause it to accelerate. As an object moves in the direction of a force acting on it, its potential energy decreases. For example, the gravitational potential energy of a cannonball at the top of a hill is greater than at the base of the hill. As it rolls downhill, its potential energy decreases and is being translated to motion – kinetic energy.

It is possible to define the potential of certain force fields so that the potential energy of an object in that field depends only on the position of the object with respect to the field. Two such force fields are a gravitational field and an electric field (in the absence of time-varying magnetic fields). Such fields affect objects because of the intrinsic properties  (e.g., mass or charge) and positions of the objects.

An object may possess a property known as electric charge. Since an electric field exerts force on a charged object, if the object has a positive charge, the force will be in the direction of the electric field vector at the location of the charge; if the charge is negative, the force will be in the opposite direction. 

The magnitude of force is given by the quantity of the charge multiplied by the magnitude of the electric field vector,

Electrostatics 

The electric potential at a point  in a static electric field  is given by the line integral

In electrostatics, the Maxwell-Faraday equation reveals that the curl  is zero, making the electric field conservative. Thus, the line integral above does not depend on the specific path  chosen but only on its endpoints, making  well-defined everywhere. The gradient theorem then allows us to write:

This states that the electric field points "downhill" towards lower voltages. By Gauss's law, the potential can also be found to satisfy Poisson's equation:

where  is the total charge density and  denotes the divergence.

The concept of electric potential is closely linked with potential energy. A test charge, has an electric potential energy, given by

The potential energy and hence, also the electric potential, is only defined up to an additive constant: one must arbitrarily choose a position where the potential energy and the electric potential are zero.

These equations cannot be used if , i.e., in the case of a non-conservative electric field (caused by a changing magnetic field; see Maxwell's equations). The generalization of electric potential to this case is described in the section .

Electric potential due to a point charge 

where  is the permittivity of vacuum,  is known as the Coulomb potential, and the ratio,

is known as the Coulomb constant.

The electric potential at any location, in a system of point charges is equal to the sum of the individual electric potentials due to every point charge in the system. This fact simplifies calculations significantly, because addition of potential (scalar) fields is much easier than addition of the electric (vector) fields. Specifically, the potential of a set of discrete point charges  at points  becomes

where
 is a point at which the potential is evaluated.
 is a point at which there is a nonzero charge.
 is the charge at the point .
and the potential of a continuous charge distribution  becomes

Where
 is a point at which the potential is evaluated.
 is a region containing all the points at which the charge density is nonzero.
 is a point inside .
 is the charge density at the point .
The equations given above for the electric potential (and all the equations used here) are in the forms required by SI units. In some other (less common) systems of units, such as CGS-Gaussian, many of these equations would be altered.

Generalization to electrodynamics 

When time-varying magnetic fields are present (which is true whenever there are time-varying electric fields and vice versa), it is not possible to describe the electric field simply in terms of a scalar potential  because the electric field is no longer conservative:  is path-dependent because  (due to the Maxwell-Faraday equation).

Instead, one can still define a scalar potential by also including the magnetic vector potential . In particular,  is defined to satisfy:

where  is the magnetic field. By the fundamental theorem of vector calculus, such an  can always be found, since the divergence of the magnetic field is always zero due to the absence of magnetic monopoles. Now, the quantity

One can therefore write

where  is the scalar potential defined by the conservative field .

The electrostatic potential is simply the special case of this definition where  is time-invariant.  On the other hand, for time-varying fields,

unlike electrostatics.

Gauge freedom 

The electrostatic potential could have any constant added to it without affecting the electric field. In electrodynamics, the electric potential has infinitely many degrees of freedom. For any (possibly time-varying or space-varying) scalar field, we can perform the following gauge transformation to find a new set of potentials that produce exactly the same electric and magnetic fields:

Given different choices of gauge, the electric potential could have quite different properties. In the Coulomb gauge, the electric potential is given by Poisson's equation

just like in electrostatics. However, in the Lorenz gauge, the electric potential is a retarded potential that propagates at the speed of light and is the solution to an inhomogeneous wave equation:

Units
The SI derived unit of electric potential is the volt (in honor of Alessandro Volta), denoted as V, which is why the electric potential difference between two points in space is known as a voltage. Older units are rarely used today.  Variants of the centimetre–gram–second system of units included a number of different units for electric potential, including the abvolt and the statvolt.

Galvani potential versus electrochemical potential

Inside metals (and other solids and liquids), the energy of an electron is affected not only by the electric potential, but also by the specific atomic environment that it is in. When a voltmeter is connected between two different types of metal, it measures the potential difference corrected for the different atomic environments. The quantity measured by a voltmeter is called electrochemical potential or fermi level, while the pure unadjusted electric potential, is sometimes called the Galvani potential, . The terms "voltage" and "electric potential" are a bit ambiguous but one may refer to either of these in different contexts.

See also
 Absolute electrode potential
 Electrochemical potential
 Electrode potential

References

Further reading 

 
 
  
 
 

Potentials
Electrostatics
Physical quantities
Voltage
Electromagnetism